"Six Feet Under" is a song by Canadian singer The Weeknd, from his third studio album Starboy (2016). It features additional vocals from American rapper Future and was written by both artists alongside Belly, DaHeala, Doc McKinney, Ben Billions, Metro Boomin, and Cirkut, with the latter four producing it with the Weeknd. It is one of the two collaborations between the Weeknd and Future to be featured on the album, the other being "All I Know". It's the second overall collaboration between the two artists on the album, previously collaborating on Future's "Low Life".

Chart performance
Like the rest of the tracks from Starboy, "Six Feet Under" charted on the Billboard Hot 100, reaching number 34. It reached the top ten on the R&B Songs chart and the top 20 on the Hot R&B/Hip-Hop Songs chart. The song also charted and peaked at number 20 on the Canadian Hot 100.

Charts

Weekly charts

Year-end charts

Certifications

References 

2016 songs
The Weeknd songs
Future (rapper) songs
Songs written by Belly (rapper)
Songs written by Future (rapper)
Songs written by the Weeknd
Songs written by Doc McKinney
Songs written by Ben Billions
Song recordings produced by Cirkut (record producer)
Song recordings produced by Metro Boomin
Song recordings produced by the Weeknd
Songs written by DaHeala
Trap music songs